The Montgomery Rebels was the name of several American minor league baseball franchises representing Montgomery, Alabama, playing in various leagues between  and . Rebels was the predominant nickname of the Montgomery teams, but it was not the original moniker, and it was one of several used by the city's 20th century professional baseball teams, which began play in organized baseball in 1903. Others included the Billikens, Bombers, Capitals, Climbers, Grays, Lambs, Lions and Senators.

Earlier, Montgomery had been a member of the Southern Association (1903–1914, and parts of 1943 and 1956), Sally League (1916, 1951 to early 1956), Southeastern League (1926–1930; 1932; 1937–1942; 1946–1950), and the Alabama–Florida League (1957–1962).

From 1950 through 1980, Montgomery played at Paterson Field (originally Municipal Stadium). It won 12 championships between 1928 and 1977, including five Southern League titles in six years (1972–1973; 1975–1977). The Tigers served as the Rebels' primary Major League Baseball parent, sponsoring the team in the Southeastern, Sally and Alabama-Florida leagues, as well as in the SL.

The Montgomery Biscuits have represented Alabama's capital in the Southern League since the  season.

Notable alumni

Dave Campbell
Pat Dobson
Dick Drago
Mark Fidrych
Pat Jarvis
Steve Kemp
Lerrin LaGrow
Jim Leyland
Mike Marshall
Jack Morris
Lance Parrish
Albie Pearson
Dan Petry
Rich Reese
Jim Rooker
Vern Ruhle
Jason Thompson
Alan Trammell
Earl Weaver
Lou Whitaker
Earl Wilson
Glenn Wilson

References

Boston Red Sox minor league affiliates
Defunct Southern League (1964–present) teams
Detroit Tigers minor league affiliates
St. Louis Cardinals minor league affiliates
Washington Senators minor league affiliates
Pittsburgh Pirates minor league affiliates
Cleveland Guardians minor league affiliates
Defunct Southeastern League teams
Defunct Dixie Association teams
South Atlantic League (1904–1963) teams
Defunct Southern Association teams
Defunct Interstate League teams
Sports in Montgomery, Alabama
Professional baseball teams in Alabama
Baseball teams established in 1903
Sports clubs disestablished in 1980
Southeastern League teams
Defunct baseball teams in Alabama
Baseball teams disestablished in 1980
Defunct Alabama-Florida League teams